Thomas Meads (2 November 1900 – 1983) was a professional footballer, who played for Stockport County, Huddersfield Town, Reading, Tottenham Hotspur and Notts County.

Football career 
Meads played for non league sides Grassmoor Ivanhoe, Claycross Town and later Matlock Town before joining Stockport County in 1923 where the left half completed 117 matches and netting on 21 occasions. He moved to Huddersfield Town in 1926 and went on to feature in 40 matches and scoring twice for the club. In 1928 he joined Reading and played 31 games and finding the net four times. Meads went on to play for Tottenham Hotspur between 1929 and 1934 where he featured in 189 matches in all competitions and scoring on six occasions for the Lilywhites. He left White Hart Lane in 1935 to end his career at Notts County where he played a further 18 matches and scoring twice.

References

External links 

 

1900 births
1983 deaths
English footballers
People from Grassmoor
Footballers from Derbyshire
Association football midfielders
English Football League players
Stockport County F.C. players
Huddersfield Town A.F.C. players
Reading F.C. players
Tottenham Hotspur F.C. players
Notts County F.C. players